Antoine Burban (born 22 July 1987) is a French rugby union footballer.

He currently plays for Stade Français in the Top 14. His usual position is at Flanker. He made his debut in 2006 and became one of the principal Flankers, he took the place of Rémy Martin. Burban was called up by the France national rugby union team in 2009 but was injured and did not play

Awards 
 Top 14 (2007)

References

External links
 Stats

1987 births
French rugby union players
Living people
Stade Français players
Sportspeople from Neuilly-sur-Seine
France international rugby union players
Rugby union flankers